The 2012 FIBA Asia Under-18 Championship qualification was held in late 2011 and early 2012 with the Persian Gulf region, West Asia, Southeast Asia, East Asia, Central Asia and South Asia each conducting tournaments.

Qualification format
The following are eligible to participate:

 The organizing country.
 The champion team from the previous FIBA Asia Under-18 Championship.
 The four best-placed teams from the previous FIBA Asia Under-18 Championship will qualify the same number of teams from their respective sub-zones.
 The two best teams from the sub-zones.

2010 FIBA Asia Under-18 Championship

Qualified teams

Central Asia
The 2012 CABA Under-18 Championship is the qualifying tournament for the 2012 FIBA Asia Under-18 Championship; it also serves as a regional championship involving Central Asia basketball teams. It was held on June 20 to June 23, 2012 at Tashkent, Uzbekistan. The winner qualifies to the 2012 FIBA Asia Under-18 Championship.

East Asia
All the others withdrew, so ,,, qualified automatically.

South Asia
The 2012 SABA Under-18 Championship was held from February 24 to 26, 2012 in New Delhi, India. The winner teams qualifies for 2010 FIBA Asia Under-18 Championship.

Southeast Asia

The 8th SEABA Under-18 Championship was held at Singapore from 26 to 30 June 2012.

References

FIBA Asia Under-18 Championship qualification
2012 FIBA Asia Under-18 Championship
2011–12 in Asian basketball